Dispur Law College is a private aided law school situated at Dharmananda Das Avenue in Dispur, Guwahati in the Indian state of Assam. It offers undergraduate 3 years law courses, 5 Year Integrated B.A. LL.B and 2 years LL.M. courses affiliated to Gauhati University. This College is recognised by Bar Council of India, New Delhi.

Dispur Law College offers undergraduate as well as postgraduate programs in law.

History
Dispur Law College was established in 1993. It was started initially in the building of Gopal Boro Government Higher Secondary School of Dispur. On 9 March 1995, the foundation stone of the college was laid by former Chief Minister of Assam Hiteswar Saikia.

References

Law schools in Assam
Universities and colleges in Guwahati
Educational institutions established in 1993
1993 establishments in Assam
Colleges affiliated to Gauhati University
Dispur